Roberto Lopes (born 17 June 1992), also known as Pico, is a professional footballer who currently plays as a defender for Shamrock Rovers. Born in Ireland, Lopes represents the Cape Verde national football team.

Shamrock Rovers
In November 2016 Lopes joined Shamrock Rovers after leaving rivals Bohemians.

In 2019 Lopes started the FAI Cup final in which Rovers went on to win after defeating Dundalk on penalties winning the cup for the first time since 1987 and for a record 25th time.
In 2020 Lopes was key member to the Shamrock Rovers squad who won the League of Ireland title for a record 18th time.

International career
Lopes was born in Ireland to a Cape Verdean father and Irish mother. Lopes made his international debut for the Cape Verde national team in a 2–0 friendly win over Togo in 2019.

He was included in Cape Verde's squad for the delayed 2021 Africa Cup of Nations tournament.

Career statistics

Club

Notes

International

Honours
Shamrock Rovers
League of Ireland Premier Division: 2020, 2021, 2022
FAI Cup: 2019
President of Ireland's Cup: 2022

Bohemians
Leinster Senior Cup: 2016

References

1992 births
Living people
Association footballers from Dublin (city)
Cape Verdean footballers
Cape Verde international footballers
Republic of Ireland association footballers
Republic of Ireland youth international footballers
Cape Verdean people of Irish descent
Irish people of Cape Verdean descent
Irish sportspeople of African descent
Citizens of Cape Verde through descent
Association football defenders
Belvedere F.C. players
Bohemian F.C. players
Shamrock Rovers F.C. players
League of Ireland players
2021 Africa Cup of Nations players